Uttam Singh (born 25 May 1948) is an Indian music director and a well-known violinist. He has also worked as a  music arranger, programmer and recordist for many Bollywood films. He worked as a music assistant for Ilaiyaraaja in numerous Tamil films before establishing himself as an independent composer.

Music career

Childhood
Uttam Singh's father was a sitar player. His family moved to Mumbai, when Singh was 12. He learned tabla and Western violin. His family used to sing kirtans at various Gurudwaras and religious functions to supplement their income.

Violinist
Uttam Singh worked as violinist for three years. His big break came in 1963, when he worked as a violinist for a documentary being made by Mohammad Safi (an assistant to Naushad). After this, Uttam Singh played violin for major composers including Naushad, Roshan, Madan Mohan, C. Ramchandra, Sachin Dev Burman. Later, he became the main violinist for S D Burman's son, Rahul Dev Burman.

Music arranger
Singh later partnered with another musician, Jagdish, to arrange music for films. The duo became reputed arrangers, working for over 65 films in several Indian languages. These films included major Rajshri Productions hits, Maine Pyar Kiya and Hum Aapke Hain Koun..!. He also worked with Ilaiyaraaja as a music arranger in various Tamil films.

Music director
Singh and Jagdish worked as music directors ("Uttam-Jagdish") for Manoj Kumar's Painter Babu. Later they worked for Manoj Kumar's other film, Clerk . Together, they also worked on the Smita Patil-Raj Babbar-Raj Kiran-Amrita Singh-Amrish Puri starrer, Waaris (1988). After Jagdish died in 1992, Singh started working independently. His most notable film as a music director was Yash Chopra's Dil To Pagal Hai. He also composed music for many other films including Hum Tumpe Marte Hain, Dushman, Farz and Pyaar Diwana Hota Hai. He also composed music for Anil Sharma's Gadar: Ek Prem Katha (2001) and later for The Hero: Love Story of a Spy.

His songs and score for the Chandra Prakash Dwivedi's 2003 partition drama Pinjar, in which he collaborated with the Wadali Brothers, won him much critical acclaim and is considered to be his finest work as composer.

Private albums
Singh recorded his first private album Om Sai Ram in 1996. Later, he also composed music for his daughter Preeti Singh's album Soor (2002).

Filmography
{| class="wikitable"
|-
! style="background:#B0C4DE;" | Year
! style="background:#B0C4DE;" | Film
! style="background:#B0C4DE;" | Role
! style="background:#B0C4DE;" | Notes
! style="background:#B0C4DE;" | Album sales
|-
| 2015
| Nanak Shah Fakir
| Music Director
|
|
|-
| 2014
| Honour Killing| Music Director
|
|
|-
| 2013
| Rajjo| Composer & Background Score
|
|
|-
| 2006
| Kachchi Sadak| Composer
|
|
|-
| rowspan="3" | 2005
| Taj Mahal: An Eternal Love Story| Composer & Background Score
|
|
|-
| Ho Jatta Hai Pyar| Composer
|
|
|-
| Hum Jo Keh Na Paaye| Miscellaneous
| Television
|
|-
| rowspan="3" | 2003
|  Baghban| Background Score
|
|
|-
| The Hero: Love Story of a Spy|   Composer
|
|
|-
| Pinjar| Composer & Background Score
| Nominated: Screen Award for Best Background MusicNominated: Zee Cine Award for Best Background MusicNominated: Apsara Award for Best Music Director
|
|-
| rowspan="2" | 2002
|  Pyaar Diwana Hota Hai| Composer
|
|
|-
| Hum Tumhare Hain Sanam| Background Score
|
|
|-
| rowspan="2" | 2001
|  Gadar: Ek Prem Katha| Composer & Background Score
| Nominated: Filmfare Award for Best Music DirectorNominated: IIFA Award for Best Music DirectorNominated: Screen Award for Best Music Director
|2,500,000
|-
| Farz| rowspan="5" | Composer
|
|
|-
| rowspan="2" | 1999
| Prem Poojari| Malayalam Film
|
|-
| Hum Tum Pe Marte Hain|
|
|-
|  1998
| Dushman|
|
|-
| 1997
| Dil To Pagal Hai| Won: Filmfare Award for Best Music DirectorWon: Zee Cine Award for Best Music Director
|12,500,000
|-
|   1995
| Guddu| rowspan="2" | Music Assistant
|
|
|-
|   rowspan="5" | 1994
| Karan|
|
|-
| Prem Shakti| Music Arranger
|
|
|-
| Jazbaat| Composer
|
|
|-
| Andaz Apna Apna| Music Assistant
|
|
|-
| Hum Aapke Hain Koun..!| Music Arranger
|
| 
|-
| rowspan="2" |  1993
| Pyaar Ka Tarana| Music Assistant
|
|
|-
| Anmol| Music Arranger
|
|
|-
| rowspan=‘’2’’ | 1992
|  Mehndi Shagna Di|  Composer (Punjabi Movie)
|   with Jagdish ("Uttam-Jagdish")
|
|-
|1992
|Farishtay| Background Score
|
|
|-
|   rowspan="3" | 1991
|    Patthar| Music Assistant
|
|
|-
|   Benaam Badsha| rowspan="2" | Music Arranger
|
|
|-
|   Patthar Ke Phool|
|
|-
|   1990
|  Shiva|  Song Mixer
|
|
|-
|   rowspan="3" | 1989
| Maine Pyar Kiya|  Music Arranger
|
| 
|-
|   Gawaahi| rowspan="6" |  Composer
| rowspan="6" |  With Jagdish ("Uttam-Jagdish")
|
|-
|   Clerk|
|-
|    rowspan="3" | 1988
| Paanch Fauladi|
|-
|  Kabrastan|
|-
|   Waaris|
|-
|   1986
| Teesra Kinara|
|-
|   1985
|  Khamosh| rowspan="3" |  Music Assistant
|
|
|-
|  1984
| Purana Mandir|
|
|-
| rowspan="2" | 1983
| Mandi|
|
|-
|  Painter Babu| Composer
| With Jagdish ("Uttam-Jagdish")
|
|-
|  1983
| Dard-E-Dil| rowspan="4" | Music Assistant 
|
|
|-
| 1982 
| Nek Parveen 
|
|
|-
|   1982
| Dharam Kanta|
|
|-
|  1981
| 36 Chowringhee Lane|
|
|-
| 1980
| Chann Pardesi|   Composer (Punjabi Movie)
| 
|
|-
|1978
| Udeekan| Music Assistant, Background Music
| with Om Verma (Punjabi Movie)
|
|-
| 1977
| Lachhi| rowspan="3" | Music Assistant 
|
|
|-
| 1977
| Aaina|
|
|-
| 1973
| Yauwan|
|
|-
!
!
!
! Total sales
! 15,000,000
|}

Awards and nominations

Awards
 Filmfare Best Music Director Award – 1997 (for Dil To Pagal Hai)

Nominations
 International Indian Film Academy Award (Best Music Director) – 2002 (for Gadar: Ek Prem Katha)
 Filmfare Best Music Director Award – 2002 (for Gadar: Ek Prem Katha)
 Screen Weekly Award (Best Background Music) -2004 (for Pinjar)
 Zee Cine Award Best Background Music – 2003 (for Pinjar)
 Screen Weekly'' Award (Best Music Director) -2002 (for Gadar: Ek Prem Katha)

References

External links
 

Filmfare Awards winners
Hindi film score composers
Indian violinists
Performers of Sikh music
1948 births
Living people
21st-century violinists
Indian Sikhs